Frengers, alternatively titled as Frengers: Not Quite Friends, But Not Quite Strangers, is the third album by Danish band Mew, originally released on 7 April 2003. The title is a portmanteau of the words "friend" and "stranger". A frenger is a person who is "not quite a friend but not quite a stranger" according to the album's accompanying booklet.

Six of the album's ten tracks were previously included on Mew's first two albums A Triumph for Man and Half the World Is Watching Me, both of which saw only limited release until they were subsequently rereleased internationally, but were rerecorded for Frengers. The other four are original recordings. The song "Her Voice Is Beyond Her Years" features vocals from Swedish singer Stina Nordenstam and "Symmetry" features vocals from 14-year-old Becky Jarrett from Georgia, US. The Japanese version of Frengers also includes the re-recordings of two more earlier songs, "I Should Have Been a Tsin-Tsi (For You)" and "Wherever".

Track listing

Japanese edition bonus tracks

Personnel

Mew
Jonas Bjerre – electric guitars, acoustic guitar, piano, harmonium, mellotron, synthesizers, vocals
Bo Madsen – electric guitars, acoustic guitar
Johan Wohlert – bass, guitars
Silas Utke Graae Jørgensen – drums, percussion

Additional personnel
Tobias Wilner Bertram - turntables on tracks 6, 8
Rich Costey - ride cymbal on track 6
Klaus Nielsen - piano on track 6
Bo Rande - trumpet on track 10
Damon Tutunjian - additional vocals on track 2, additional guitars on track 9
Patrick Warren - piano on tracks 1, 8
Nick Watts - piano on tracks 4, 10, synthesizers on tracks 9, 10
George Marino - mastering
Stefan Ruiz - photography
Flemming Rasmussen, Troels Alsted, Andreas Hviid, Dan Lefler, Darren Mora and Fred Archanbault - additional engineering

Singles

 
Notes
 a^ Re-released in 2000, 2002 and 2003. Peaked at #76 on the UK Singles Chart in 2002.
 b^ Re-released in 2003. Peaked at #137 on UK Singles Chart on its first release.

References

2003 albums
Mew (band) albums
Albums produced by Joshua (record producer)
Albums produced by Rich Costey